The Liberator Magazine is a publication/production company started by Brian Kasoro, Gayle Smaller, Tazz Hunter, Kenya McKnight, Marcus Harcus and Mike Clark in Minneapolis, Minnesota, USA. The company's first release was published July 21, 2002. Originally known as The Minneapolis Liberator, the company's name was later changed to The Liberator Magazine when it was incorporated and expanded onto the internet.

Featured interviews 
Al Franken, Askia Toure, Brent "Siddiq" Sayers (founder of Rhymesayers Entertainment), Brian Jackson, Brother Ali, Cee Lo, Chuck D, Cody Chesnutt, David Banner, Don Samuels, Game Rebellion, Grandmaster Flash, George Clinton, I-Self Devine, James Spooner, Jeff Chang (journalist), J Davey, Kara Walker, Kevin Willmott, K'naan, K-os, M-1 (rapper) (of Dead Prez), Malidoma Patrice Somé, Method Man, Mumia Abu-Jamal, Nathalie Johnson-Lee, Nikki Giovanni, Rahki, Runoko Rashidi, Saul Williams, Stic.man (of Dead Prez), Talib Kweli, The Slack Republic, Whodini

Events 
Twin Cities Community Forum (August 19, 2006), Live From Planet Earth (periodically)

Notable contributors
 Stephanie Joy Tisdale
 Kamille Whittaker
 Nikki Pressley - Darrow School
 Dr. Greg Kimathi Carr - Howard University
 Dr. Melvin Barrolle - Morgan State University
 Mũkoma wa Ngũgĩ (son of Ngũgĩ wa Thiong'o) - Cornell University
 Michael J. Wilson - New York City College of Technology
 Tanya Morgan
 Keith Knight (cartoonist)
 Dr. Josh Myers - Howard University
 Dr. Anyabwile Aaron Love - Pennsylvania State University
 Dr. Abdul M. Omari - University of Minnesota
 Dr. Melisa Riviere - University of Minnesota
 Jon Jon Scott
 Charlotte Hill O'Neal (wife of Pete O'Neal) - United African Alliance Community Center
 Anthony Bottom aka Jalil Abdul Muntaqim
 Peter S. Scholtes - City Pages
 Joseph Lamour - BuzzFeed
 Danielle Scruggs - LivingSocial
 Jamilah Lemieux - Ebony (magazine)

Honors
2010 Induction into the Chimurenga (magazine) Library
2012 Stocked at MoMA PS1 Artbook

References

External links 
 Official site for The Liberator Magazine

2002 establishments in Minnesota
Bimonthly magazines published in the United States
Magazines established in 2002
Magazines published in Minnesota
Mass media in Minneapolis–Saint Paul